Eurytides celadon, the Cuban kite swallowtail or celadon swallowtail, is a species of butterfly in the family Papilionidae. It is endemic to Cuba. Occasional strays can be found on the Florida Keys.

The wingspan is 66–85 mm. Adults are on wing from July to October in two generations. Its host plant is believed to be Nectandra coriacea.

References

Further reading
Edwin Möhn, 2002 Schmetterlinge der Erde, Butterflies of the World Part XIIII (14), Papilionidae VIII: Baronia, Euryades, Protographium, Neographium, Eurytides. Edited by Erich Bauer and Thomas Frankenbach Keltern: Goecke & Evers; Canterbury: Hillside Books.  All species and subspecies are included, also most of the forms. Several females are shown the first time in colour.

Eurytides
Butterflies of Cuba
Endemic fauna of Cuba
Butterflies described in 1852
Taxa named by Hippolyte Lucas